Ionuț Lucian Mureșan (born 6 October 1994) is a Romanian rugby union football player. He plays in the lock position for professional SuperLiga club Timișoara Saracens. He also plays for Romania's national team, the Oaks, making his international debut at the autumn tests in 2016 in a match against the Los Teros.

Career
Before joining Timișoara Saracens, Ionuț Mureșan played for Universitatea Cluj and Știința Petroșani as a junior.

References

External links

 Ionuț Mureșan at Timișoara Saracens website

1994 births
Living people
People from Turda
Romanian rugby union players
Romania international rugby union players
CS Universitatea Cluj-Napoca (rugby union) players
SCM Rugby Timișoara players	
Rugby union locks